On/Off (stylized as ON/OFF) is a Japanese musical duo consisting of twin brothers  and . The duo debuted in 2007 releasing the single .

History
The single debuted at number 59 on the Oricon charts. Following the release of "Eien no Setsuna" was their second single  on June 4, 2008. The single achieved more success than their debut single charting at number 19 on the charts. "Futatsu no Kodō to Akai Tsumi" was used as the opening theme song for the first season of anime series Vampire Knight. The former charted at number 18 on the charts and was used as the opening for the second season of Vampire Knight; while the latter failed to chart on the Top 30. Their single "Butterfly" was also used in the anime Durarara!! as the ending theme song. Their new singles "Hajimaru no wa, Sayonara" was used as second opening for anime series Beelzebub and was composed and produced by popular J-pop artist Daisuke Asakura. On 2/11/11 they release their new single 'Akatsuki' and on 7/12/11 is the release of their new album 'Legend of Twins II : Zoku Futago Densetsu'

Discography

Albums

Singles

References

External links
  
 

Japanese pop music groups
Defstar Records artists
Musical groups from Fukuoka Prefecture
Japanese boy bands
Twin musical duos